Palleon lolontany is a species of chameleon endemic to Madagascar. It was first described by Raxworthy and Nussbaum in 1995 as Brookesia lolontany. It was since placed in the genus Palleon when that genus was erected in 2013. The International Union for Conservation of Nature (IUCN) rated the species as Near Threatened.

Distribution and habitat
Palleon lolontany is endemic to Mount Tsaratanana (Maromokotro), Madagascar's highest mountain, on the Tsaratanana Massif. It is listed as Near Threatened  because it is only found at most in 468 square km, and if the slash-and-burn method of agriculture were used, the species would continue to decline in number, making the list of an endangered species. The species is also at risk from logging, although it is up to 2100 m above sea level. Currently, the population is stable.

Taxonomy
Palleon lolontany was described in 1995 by Raxworthy and Nussbaum, but was reclassified as a species in the genus Palleon in 2013.

References

Reptiles described in 1995
Palleon
Fauna of the Madagascar subhumid forests